Aleksandra Sergeyevna Khokhlova (born Alexandra Sergeyevna Botkina, 4 October 1897 – 22 August 1985) was a Soviet actress, theatre director, writer, and educator.

Biography 

The daughter of Sergei Botkin (1859–1910), a physician, and Alexandra Pavlovna Botkina (née Tretyakova, 1867–1959), Alexandra Sergeyevna Botkina was born in Berlin, in what was then the German Empire. She had a sister, Anastasia, and was the granddaughter of Pavel Tretyakov, a philanthropist and patron of the arts. In 1914, she married actor Konstantin Khokhlov. They had one child together, a son named Sergei.

She appeared as a supporting actress in the 1916 film Uragan (Hurricane) directed by Boris Sushkevich and in the 1918 film Iola directed by Władysław Starewicz. In 1919, she passed the entrance exam for the State Institute of Cinematography in Moscow. There she met Lev Kuleshov who would become her partner in film and in life. Khokhlova appeared in the 1920 film Na krasnom fronte (On the Red Front) directed by Kuleshov; he also acted in the film, which combined archival footage with staged film sequences. Khokhlova's career in film was cut short when she fell out of favour because of her family's wealth and connections with Tsar Nicholas II.

Besides acting and directing, Khokhlova also taught a workshop at the state institute with Kuleshov. In 1935, she was named a Merited Artist of the Russian Federation.

With her husband, she published a memoir 50 Let v Kino (50 Years in Cinema).

Khokhlova died in Moscow at the age of 87.

Selected filmography

Acting roles 
 Zheleznaia Piata (The Iron Heel) (1919) directed by Vladimir Gardin
 Neobychainye prikliucheniia mistera Vesta v strane bolshevikov (The Extraordinary Adventures of Mr. West in the Land of the Bolsheviks), comedy (1924) directed by Lev Kuleshov
 Luch smerti (The Death Ray) (1925) directed by Lev Kuleshov, Kholhlova was also assistant director
 Po zakonu (By the Law) (1926) directed by Lev Kuleshov
 Vasha znakomaia (Your Acquaintance) (1927) directed by Lev Kuleshov
 Velikii uteshitel''' (The Great Consoler) (1933) directed by Lev Kuleshov, Kholhlova was also assistant director
 Sibiryaki' (Siberians) (1940) directed by Lev Kuleshov

 Directing 
 Delo s zastezhkami (An affair of the clasps)  (1929)
 Sasha (1930)
 Igrushki (Toys) (1933)

 Assistant director 
 My s Urala'' (We from the Urals) (1943), directed by Lev Kuleshov

References

External links 
 
 Aleksandra Khokhlova at the Women Film Pioneers Project

1897 births
1985 deaths
Actresses from the Russian Empire
Soviet actresses
Soviet women film directors
Soviet screenwriters
Soviet women writers
Women film pioneers
Soviet film directors
Women screenwriters